Phatthalung may refer to
the town Phatthalung
Phatthalung Province
Mueang Phatthalung district